The following is a list of University Football Club leading goalkickers in each of their seasons in the Victorian Football League.

References
University Goalkicking Records

! 
University Football Club goalkickers
University Football Club goalkickers